DZWR (99.9 FM), broadcasting as 99.9 Country, is a radio station owned and operated by Mountain Province Broadcasting Corporation, the media arm of the Diocese of Baguio. The station's studio and transmitter are located at the MPBC Broadcast Center, #72 Fr. Carlos St., Bishop's House Compound, Brgy. Kabayanihan, Baguio. It is the only station in the Philippines airing a Country format.

History
Established in 1977, DZWR was one of the pioneer FM stations in Baguio, along with DZYB and DWHB. It was formerly located at the St. Louis University Compound along A. Bonifacio St. until 2013, when it moved to its present location. Its old studios are now occupied by The Halfway Home for Boys, an SLU-owned Foundation.

It was formerly known as Super FM with a Soft AC format. In 1991, it rebranded as WR Pinoy and switched to an all-OPM format. In 1995, it rebranded as Magic 99.9 and switched to a Top 40 format. In the early 2000s, it shifted its format to Country under the helm of Rev. Fr. Paul C. Basilio. In 2013, the Magic branding was dropped and the station is simply known as 99.9 Country.

Its former famous jocks during Magic 99.9 years and early on includes the late Peter John (de Vera), Ms. Em, Doctor J (Jay Guasch), Jorge Castro as Dark Man, Andrew Piñero as Daffy D., the "Big Mouth" Murphy, Bugs B., DJ Ariele, Chai Aquino, Lina Sotto, Brother Jim (up to the present), etc., were the best DJs in their generation that time with an all English spiels.

References

Radio stations in Baguio
Catholic radio stations
Radio stations established in 1977